Robert Douglas Stuart Jr. (April 26, 1916 – May 8, 2014) was the son of Quaker Oats Company co-founder R. Douglas Stuart, the founder of the America First Committee in 1940, the CEO of Quaker Oats from 1966 to 1981, and United States Ambassador to Norway from 1984 to 1989.

Early life
Stuart was born in Winnetka, Illinois, on April 26, 1916, the son of Harriet (McClure) and R. Douglas Stuart. His grandfather, Robert Stuart was one of the founders of the Quaker Oats Company. He was educated at Princeton University, graduating with a B.A. in 1937. He then attended Yale Law School.

America First
On September 4, 1940, while a law student, Stuart organized the anti-interventionist organization America First Committee to support the enforcement of the Neutrality Acts of 1930s and to oppose United States intervention in World War II. Other students who joined Stuart's committee included Gerald Ford, Sargent Shriver, and Potter Stewart. The America First Committee asked Robert E. Wood, chairman of Sears, Roebuck and Company, to become its leader. They later asked Charles Lindbergh to serve as their spokesman.

At its height, the America First Committee may have had as many as 800,000 members in 650 chapters. It was disbanded shortly after the attack on Pearl Harbor by the Empire of Japan, on December 7, 1941.

Army service
Stuart served in the US Army during World War II, attaining the rank of major. After the war, he returned to Yale Law School and received his J.D. in 1946.

Career
Stuart joined the Quaker Oats Company, where he would work for 38 years. He was chief executive officer of the company from 1966 to 1981, first as president and later as chairman of the board.

Stuart's time as CEO was notable for diversifying the company, most notably in 1969, when the Quaker Oats Company acquired toy manufacturer Fisher-Price. During his time as CEO, revenues grew from $500 million to $2 billion.

In addition to running Quaker Oats, Stuart sat on the boards of directors of the First National Bank of Chicago, United Airlines, Deere & Company, and Molson.

Stuart was active in the Republican Party. From 1964 to 1972, he was the Illinois Republican Party member on the Republican National Committee.

He was also active in the Boy Scouts of America and the Chicago Urban League.

In 1984, President Ronald Reagan named Stuart as United States Ambassador to Norway. Stuart presented his credentials on October 16, 1984, and served as ambassador until July 17, 1989.

Stuart was a member of the Base Realignment and Closure Commission in 1991 and 1993. He was appointed to the 1991 commission by President George H. W. Bush and the 1993 commission by President Bill Clinton.

He served on the board of the National Commission on the Public Service, which was chaired by Paul Volcker, which produced the Volcker Report in 2003.

Death
Stuart died of a heart attack while he was traveling back to the United States from France, at the age of 98, on May 8, 2014.

References

External links
Profile from the Council of American Ambassadors
Political Graveyard Profile

1916 births
2014 deaths
20th-century American businesspeople
20th-century American diplomats
21st-century American businesspeople
Ambassadors of the United States to Norway
American anti-war activists
Anti–World War II activists
Businesspeople from Chicago
Illinois Republicans
Non-interventionism
Old Right (United States)
Princeton University alumni
Quaker Oats Company
Yale Law School alumni